Henry Richmond may refer to:

 Henry Richmond (bishop) (1936–2017), Bishop of Repton
 Henry Richmond (1943–2021), American attorney, inaugural director of the land use watchdog group 1000 Friends of Oregon
 Henry Richmond (politician) (1829–1890), New Zealand politician and farmer
 Henry of Richmond, Henry VII of England

See also
 
 Richmond (surname)